Victor Murdock (March 18, 1871 – July 8, 1945) was an American politician and newspaper editor who served as a U.S. Representative from Kansas.

Life
Victor Murdock was born March 18, 1871, in Burlingame, Kansas to Marshall Murdock, editor of the Osage County Chronicle, and Victoria Mayberry Murdock. In 1872, the family moved to Wichita, where Victor Murdock received his common school education, began learning the printing trade, and at age 15 became a reporter. In 1890, he married Mary Pearl Allen, spent some time in Chicago where he worked on the Inter-Ocean, and then in 1894 became managing editor of the Wichita Eagle until 1903. In 1892 he reported on Representative and future president William McKinley's campaign for governor of Ohio.

Murdock was covering the Kansas legislature when he decided to run for a vacancy in the United States House of Representatives and was elected to follow Chester I. Long, who had resigned to take a Senate seat, on May 26, 1903, taking office on November 9, 1903. During the 1912 United States presidential election he left the Republican Party to support and join former President Theodore Roosevelt's Progressive Party and was the party's choice for Speaker of the House in 1912. Murdock served in Congress until March 3, 1915.

He was elected as chairman of the Progressive Party in 1914 and 1916. In 1916, when Theodore Roosevelt refused to run, the Progressive Party nominated Murdock for president, but he did not appear on the ballot. Murdock worked as a war correspondent in 1916, in 1917 he was appointed to the Federal Trade Commission by President Woodrow Wilson and served until his resignation in 1924 to become the editor for The Wichita Eagle until his death in Wichita on July 8, 1945.

References

External links
 
 
 Biographical Directory of the United States Congress
 1936 photo of Victor Murdock making a speech in Wichita, Kansas

1871 births
1945 deaths
People from Burlingame, Kansas
Politicians from Wichita, Kansas
American newspaper reporters and correspondents
Kansas Progressives (1912)
American war correspondents
American newspaper editors
Republican Party members of the United States House of Representatives from Kansas
Federal Trade Commission personnel
Woodrow Wilson administration personnel
Harding administration personnel